Chinmay Udgirkar is an Indian actor. He debuted with a reality show called Maharashtracha Superstar in 2009–2010. He was ranked twenty-fifth in The Times of India's Top 30 Most Desirable Men of Maharashtra in 2019.

Early life and career 
Chinmay made his debut on television from the television show Maharashtracha Superstar on Zee Marathi in 2009. Then, he got role in the Marathi serial Swapnanchya Palikadle on Star Pravah in 2010. He played a character of Shreyas Patkar in that serial.

Chinmay also hosted the reality show called Maharashtracha Dancing Superstar Chote Masters (2013). He also played a role in another serial named Nanda Saukhya Bhare (2016) on Zee Marathi.

He made his debut in Marathi film industry with movie Shyamche Vadil in 2012. He played a leading character of Shyam in this movie. He also acted in another film which name was Vaajlaach Pahije. He also performed in the theatre. He acted for few plays like Rim Jhim Rim Jhim, Elkunchwar etc. He acted in Colors Marathi's Ghadge & Suun (2017). He played a lead character of Akshay Ghadge. He was also seen in the lead role of Premwari.

Personal life 
He married his co-actor of Vaajlaach Pahije Girija Joshi on 27 November 2015.

Filmography

Feature films

Television

Stage

References

External links
 

Marathi actors
Indian male soap opera actors
Living people
Male actors in Marathi theatre
Year of birth missing (living people)
Male actors in Marathi television